Abrar Alam (born 9 October 1996) is a Bangladeshi cricketer. He made his List A debut for Uttara Sporting Club in the 2018–19 Dhaka Premier Division Cricket League on 23 March 2019.

References

External links
 

1996 births
Living people
Bangladeshi cricketers
Uttara Sporting Club cricketers
Cricketers from Dhaka